Raphael Honigstein (born 1973) is a German journalist and author.

Early life
Honigstein was born in Bavaria to a Jewish family. In 1993, Honigstein moved from Munich to London. He studied law before becoming a journalist.

Journalism career
In the 1990s, Honigstein wrote about pop culture for the German youth magazine jetzt.

Honigstein is the English football correspondent for the German newspaper Süddeutsche Zeitung, and has been the German football correspondent for the British newspaper The Guardian and the UK radio broadcaster, talkSPORT. In addition, he also contributes to Germany's popular football magazine, 11Freunde and the British football quarterly, The Blizzard. 

Honigstein now writes for the UK arm of The Athletic.

Broadcasting
Honigstein regularly appears on the podcast The Totally Football Show and, before its cancellation, on BT Sport television programme Sunday Night Football, both hosted by James Richardson, where he gives updates on German football. He has also worked as a German football expert for Sky Sports, alongside host Alan McInally, and on Setanta's coverage of the Bundesliga. He has also appeared on The Friday Football Show on Setanta, and on Setanta Sports News, discussing German football. He occasionally appears on the football show, ESPN Soccernet Press Pass.

He is a regular for the BBC on BBC Radio 5 Live’s Euro leagues show presented by Steve Crossman, with Guillem Balague, James Horncastle, and Julien Laurens.

Publications
Honigstein's book on the peculiarities of English football, Harder, Better, Faster, Stronger. Die geheime Geschichte des englischen Fußballs, was published in German by Kiepenheuer & Witsch in 2006, and the English version Englischer Fussball: A German View of Our Beautiful Game was published by Yellow Jersey Press in 2008.

Honigstein's book, Das Reboot: How German Football Reinvented Itself and Conquered the World, was published by Yellow Jersey Press in 2015 and charts the return of German football from the international wilderness of the late 1990s to victory at the 2014 FIFA World Cup in Brazil.

His latest book, Klopp: Bring the Noise was also published by Yellow Jersey Press in 2017 and tells the definitive story of Jurgen Klopp’s career, transformative footballing genius and how he is bringing the noise to Anfield.

References

External links
Weekly Bundesliga Predictions BetVictor Blog DE 
Football Weekly archive The Guardian 
Interview with Raphael Honigstein Soccerlens, 9 September 2008
Raphael Honigstein: Rafa the gaffer European Football Weekends, 18 July 2010

1973 births
Living people
The Guardian journalists
German podcasters
Honigstein
Honigstein
German Internet celebrities
German sports journalists
German male writers
German sports broadcasters
21st-century German journalists
Süddeutsche Zeitung people
German Jews